General elections were held in Zambia on 31 October 1991 to elect a President and National Assembly. They were the first multi-party elections since 1968, and only the second multi-party elections since independence in 1964. The United National Independence Party (UNIP), which had led the country since independence (from 1973 to 1990 as the sole legal party), was comprehensively beaten by the Movement for Multi-Party Democracy (MMD). Kenneth Kaunda, who had been president since independence, was defeated in a landslide by MMD challenger Frederick Chiluba in the presidential elections, whilst the MMD won 125 of the 150 elected seats in the expanded National Assembly. Voter turnout was 45%.

Background
In 1973, Kaunda had declared UNIP the only legally permitted party in Zambia. From then until 1990, the government and UNIP were effectively one. Every five years, Kaunda was automatically elected to a five-year term as president by virtue of being leader of UNIP. Voters also chose between three UNIP candidates for each of the 125 seats in the National Assembly.

However, by the summer of 1990 discontent had built to a fever pitch. In July, following three days of riots in Lusaka, Kaunda announced a referendum on the single-party system would be held in October. This was not enough to prevent disgruntled army officer Mwamba Luchembe from launching a coup attempt within a few hours of the announcement. However, it was broken after about three to four hours. After the coup attempt, the opposition contended that the original date for the referendum did not allow enough time to register voters. In response, Kaunda delayed the referendum until August 1991.

Kaunda had vehemently opposed a multiparty system, claiming it would cause violence and inflame tribal divisions. However, in response to demands from the opposition, he cancelled the referendum in September and instead gave his support to constitutional amendments that would end UNIP's monopoly on power. He also announced that the general elections scheduled for 1993 would be brought forward to 1991. Kaunda signed the necessary amendments into law in December. Soon afterward, the Movement for Multi-Party Democracy, a pressure group created earlier in the year under the leadership of Zambia Congress of Trade Unions chairman Chiluba, registered as a political party.

Results

President

National Assembly

See also
List of members of the National Assembly of Zambia (1991–96)

References

1991 in Zambia
Elections in Zambia
Zambia
Presidential elections in Zambia
October 1991 events in Africa